Cristina Gallo (born 4 January 1976) is an Argentine sports shooter. She competed in two events at the 1996 Summer Olympics.

References

1976 births
Living people
Argentine female sport shooters
Olympic shooters of Argentina
Shooters at the 1996 Summer Olympics
Place of birth missing (living people)